Pete Augustine is the former president of New Era Cap Company.  In January 2015, it was announced he would be leaving and owner and CEO Chris Koch would take over his duties as president.

Background and education
Augustine was the first person to join the family-owned company whose job did not involve making caps. He was hired in 1990 as their first accountant.  He served as Controller, CFO and COO during his tenure. In 2003, he was named president of the company.

Augustine received his Bachelor of Science in accounting and finance in 1987 from the School of Management at the State University of New York at Buffalo. He played an active role in the development of his alma mater's collegiate athletics department, serving as the chairperson of the board of advisors of the "New York Bulls Initiative".

References

American chief executives of manufacturing companies
University at Buffalo alumni
Living people
American chief financial officers
American chief operating officers
Year of birth missing (living people)